"Goodbyes" is a song by American rapper and singer Post Malone featuring fellow American rapper and singer Young Thug. It was released as the second single from Malone's third studio album, Hollywood's Bleeding, via Republic Records on July 5, 2019, one day after Malone's 24th birthday. The song was written by the artists, Billy Walsh, Val Blavatnik, Jessie Foutz, and producers Brian Lee & Louis Bell It became Malone's seventh top 10 on the US Billboard Hot 100, as well as his sixth number-one on Billboard's Rhythmic chart. Along with "Sunflower" and "Wow", Malone achieved three consecutive US Rhythmic No. 1s to come from one album (Hollywood's Bleeding), and was the first time the feat was achieved after Drake's Scorpion spawned three chart leaders in 2018.

Composition
The song talks about the end of a relationship, and was called "melodic" by Rap-Up, on which Post Malone sings the chorus: "I want you out of my head / I want you out of my bedroom tonight / There's no way I could save you / 'Cause I need to be saved too / I'm no good at goodbyes."

Promotion
Post Malone announced the track and its feature and release date on social media on July 1, 2019, sharing an image styled like a film poster for the song, featuring the tagline "Too Much Pleasure Is Pain", a line from the song. He then revealed the cover art of the song on social media on July 2. He then posted a snippet of the beginning of the video of him being stabbed and killed by the enemy team on July 3. The music video was published on the day of the song's release on July 5 and the lyric video was published three days after on July 8.

Music video
The original "R" rated music video was released alongside the song on July 5, and directed by Colin Tilley. It features Malone playing a gang member who dies after being repeatedly stabbed in graphic fashion by a member of a rival gang, before rising from the dead in a graveyard. Young Thug and actress Kathryn Newton also appear in the video. Due to this, YouTube made the video age-restricted. A "PG" version was released on July 7 which omits the graphic sequence. It has over 218 million views as of March 2021.

Personnel
Credits adapted from Post Malone's Twitter and Tidal.

 Post Malone – principal vocalist, songwriting
 Young Thug – featured vocalist, songwriting
 Brian Lee – production, programming, all instrumentation, songwriting
 Louis Bell – production, recording, vocal production, programming, all instrumentation, songwriting
 Billy Walsh – songwriting
 Val Blavatnik – songwriting
 Jessie Foutz – songwriting
 Manny Marroquin – mixing
 Chris Galland – mixing assistant
 Robin Florent – mixing assistant
 Scott Desmarais – mixing assistant
 Jeremie Inhaber – mixing assistant
 Mike Bozzi – mastering
 Travis Brothers – design
 Bryan Rivera – design
 Collin Fletcher – design
 Anton Reva – design

Awards and nominations

Charts

Weekly charts

Year-end charts

Certifications and sales

Release history

References

2019 singles
2019 songs
Post Malone songs
Young Thug songs
Music videos directed by Colin Tilley
Songs written by Young Thug
Songs written by Post Malone
Songs written by Brian Lee (songwriter)
Songs written by Louis Bell
Song recordings produced by Louis Bell
Republic Records singles